Howard Round (1878 – 1957) was an English footballer who played one game for Port Vale in September 1900.

Career
Round played for Tunstall Casuals before joining Second Division side Port Vale in July 1900. His sole appearance was in the 6–1 defeat to Grimsby Town at Blundell Park on 8 September. He left the Athletic Ground at the end of the season.

Career statistics
Source:

References

1878 births
1957 deaths
Sportspeople from Newcastle-under-Lyme
English footballers
Association football forwards
Port Vale F.C. players
English Football League players